John Drinkwater (1 June 1882 – 25 March 1937) was an English poet and dramatist. He was known before World War I as one of the Dymock poets, and his poetry was included in all five volumes of Georgian Poetry (edited by Edward Marsh, 1912-1922). After World War I, he achieved fame as a playwright and became closely associated with Birmingham Repertory Theatre.

Life and career
Drinkwater was born in Leytonstone, Essex (now Greater London), to actor/author Albert Edwin Drinkwater (1851–1923) and Annie Beck (née Brown), and worked as an insurance clerk. In the period immediately before the First World War, he was one of the group of poets associated with the Gloucestershire village of Dymock, along with Rupert Brooke, Lascelles Abercrombie, Wilfrid Wilson Gibson and others. 

In 1918, he had his first major success with his play Abraham Lincoln. He followed it with others in a similar vein, including Mary Stuart and Oliver Cromwell.

He had published poetry since The Death of Leander in 1906; the first volume of his Collected Poems was published in 1923. He also compiled anthologies and wrote literary criticism (e.g. Swinburne: an estimate (1913)), and later became manager of Birmingham Repertory Theatre.

He was married to Daisy Kennedy, the ex-wife of Benno Moiseiwitsch, with whom he had a daughter named Penny. 

John Drinkwater made recordings in Columbia Records' International Educational Society Lecture series. They include Lecture 10 – a lecture on The Speaking of Verse (four 78rpm sides, Cat no. D 40018-40019), and Lecture 70 John Drinkwater reading his own poems (four 78rpm sides, Cat no. D 40140-40141).

Death and commemoration

Drinkwater died in London in 1937 at the age of 54. He is buried at Piddington, Oxfordshire, where he had spent summer holidays as a child.

A road in Leytonstone, formerly a 1960s council estate, is named after Drinkwater, as is a small development of modern houses in Piddington.

Archives 
Papers of John Drinkwater are held at the Cadbury Research Library, University of Birmingham. This includes a collection of photographs and photograph albums relating to Drinkwater. There are also some Drinkwater papers in the Ashley Library in the British Library, and a large amount of correspondence held at Yale University.

Notes

External links

John Drinkwater memorial site
Special Collections and Archives Catalogue University of Gloucestershire Archives and Special Collections
 
 
 
 Discussion of John Drinkwater's play Abraham Lincoln
 
 Archival Material at 
Plays by John Drinkwater at Great War Theatre
John Drinkwater Collection. General Collection, Beinecke Rare Book and Manuscript Library, Yale University

1882 births
1937 deaths
People educated at the City of Oxford High School for Boys
People from Leytonstone
English male dramatists and playwrights
English male poets
20th-century English poets
20th-century English dramatists and playwrights
20th-century English male writers